The Ashland Historic District encompasses the historic central core of Ashland, Virginia, now a suburb of nearby Richmond.  The town developed in the mid-19th century as a summer resort area, but in the late 19th and early 20th century it grew more significantly as a streetcar suburb of its larger neighbor.  Its central core had its biggest building boom between about 1875 and 1920, and contains a large assortment of high-quality residences in Colonial Revival, Queen Anne, and other styles.  The district is centered on the junction of Center Street with Virginia State Route 54, and has a roughly cruciform shape covering .

The district was listed on the National Register of Historic Places in 1983.

See also
National Register of Historic Places listings in Hanover County, Virginia

References

Historic districts on the National Register of Historic Places in Virginia
National Register of Historic Places in Hanover County, Virginia
Victorian architecture in Virginia
Hanover County, Virginia